Beauchamp–Feuillet notation is a system of dance notation used in Baroque dance.

The notation was commissioned by Louis XIV (who had founded the Académie Royale de Danse in 1661), and devised in the 1680s by Pierre Beauchamp.  The notation system was first described in detail in 1700 by Raoul-Auger Feuillet in Chorégraphie.  Feuillet also then began a programme of publishing complete notated dances.  It was used to record dances for the stage and domestic use throughout the eighteenth century, being modified by Pierre Rameau in 1725, and surviving into at least the 1780s in various modified forms.

One of the innovations of this notation, as you can see in the sample below, was to show the music, on a staff as a musician would use it, across the top of a page. The roles of the dancer or dancers, the tract they were to follow, and the steps to perform are shown in the notation below. The bar markings on the music are also drawn across the tract of the dancers, clarifying the relation of the steps to the music. The focus of the notation is the footwork

Reading
Raoul Auger Feuillet (1700) Chorégraphie, ou l'art de d'écrire la danse (Paris)
a facsimile of the 1700 Paris edition (1968: Broude Brothers)
translated into English by John Weaver: (1706) Orchesography (London)
translated into English by P. Siris: (1706) The Art of Dancing (London)
Raoul Auger Feuillet (1706) Recueil de contredanses (Paris)
a facsimile of the 1706 Paris edition (1968: Broude Brothers)
Wendy Hilton “Dance of court and theater: the French noble style 1690–1725”
reprinted in: (1997) Dance and Music of Court and Theater: Selected Writings of Wendy Hilton (Pendragon Press) 
Meredith Ellis Little & Carol G. Marsh (1992) La Danse Noble: An Inventory of Dances and Sources (Broude Brothers) 
Pierre Rameau (1725) Le Maître à danser (Paris)
a facsimile of the 1725 Paris edition (1967: Broude Brothers)
translated John Essex: (1728) The Dancing Master (London)
Pierre Rameau (1725) Abbregé de la nouvelle methode (Paris)
Kellom Tomlinson (1735) The Art of Dancing (London)
Gregorio Lambranzi (1716) Neue und Curieuse Theatralische Tantz-Schul (Nürnberg) 
Philippa Waite & Judith Appleby (2003) Beauchamp–Feuillet Notation: A Guide for Beginner and Intermediate Baroque Dance Students (Cardiff:Consort de Danse Baroque)

External links
Wilson, David. 
Project Gutenberg copy of the John Weaver, English language, 1706, book Orchesography, based on the Feuillet, French language, 1700, book Chorégraphie
The books of John Weaver - Facsimiles of 18th-century English translations of Feuillet's books.
Baroque Dance Notation by Paige Whitley-Bauguess, including an introduction to reading Beauchamp-Feuillet notation.

Dance notation
Baroque dance